Slaven Skeledžić  (born 15 November 1971) is a German-Bosnian football manager. He is currently the assistant manager of Austrian Bundesliga club Rheindorf Altach.

Managerial career
Skeledžić coached many youth clubs in Germany, including youth clubs of Bundesliga teams and second tier teams in Germany. On 9 February 2015, he signed a contract with the Afghanistan Football Federation to coach their national team. With his experience and skills he wants to bring the European style of play to Afghanistan. He was fired as coach of the national team after many defeats.

On 1 July 2018, Skeledžić  was hired as the assistant manager to Miroslav Klose at Bayern Munich U17 team. In June 2022, both were appointed as staff for Austrian club SCR Altach.

Personal life
Born in Bosnia, Skeledžić  left his country at the age of 4 with his parents to build a future in Germany. He currently lives in Bad Homburg.

References

1971 births
Living people
People from Vareš
Bosnia and Herzegovina emigrants to Germany
Bosnia and Herzegovina football managers
German football managers
Eintracht Frankfurt non-playing staff
FC Hansa Rostock non-playing staff
Hannover 96 non-playing staff
Afghanistan national football team managers
FC Bayern Munich non-playing staff
Bosnia and Herzegovina expatriate football managers
Expatriate football managers in Afghanistan
Bosnia and Herzegovina expatriate sportspeople in China